In the 2013–14 season, ES Sétif competed in the Ligue 1 for the 44th season, as well as the Algerian Cup.  It was their 16th consecutive season in the top flight of Algerian football.

Competitions

Overview

{| class="wikitable" style="text-align: center"
|-
!rowspan=2|Competition
!colspan=8|Record
!rowspan=2|Started round
!rowspan=2|Final position / round
!rowspan=2|First match	
!rowspan=2|Last match
|-
!
!
!
!
!
!
!
!
|-
| Ligue 1

|  
| 3rd
| 24 August 2013
| 22 May 2014
|-
| Algerian Cup

| Round of 64 
| Round of 16
| 7 December 2013
| 24 January 2014
|-
| Super Cup

| Final 
| style="background:gold;"| Winners
| colspan=2| 11 January 2014 
|-
| CAF Confederation Cup

| colspan=2| Group stage
| 19 July 2013
| 21 September 2013
|-
| Champions League

| First round 
| Group stage
| 2 March 2014
| 7 June 2014
|-
! Total

Ligue 1

League table

Results summary

Results by round

Matches

Algerian Cup

Algerian Super Cup

CAF Confederation Cup

Group stage

Champions League

First round

Second round

Group stage

Squad information

Playing statistics

|-
! colspan=16 style=background:#dcdcdc; text-align:center| Goalkeepers

|-
! colspan=16 style=background:#dcdcdc; text-align:center| Defenders

|-
! colspan=16 style=background:#dcdcdc; text-align:center| Midfielders

|-
! colspan=16 style=background:#dcdcdc; text-align:center| Forwards

|-
! colspan=16 style=background:#dcdcdc; text-align:center| Players transferred out during the season

Goalscorers

Transfers

In

Out

Notes

References

External links
 2013–14 ES Sétif season at dzfoot.com 

ES Sétif seasons
Algerian football clubs 2013–14 season